CERS (Centre for Relationship Marketing and Service Management) is a research and competence centre at the Hanken School of Economics in Helsinki, Finland. The centre operates in conjunction with the department of marketing, and specialises in research on service management and relationship marketing. There are currently about 50 senior researchers and doctoral students associated to CERS.

History 
CERS was founded in 1994 by professor Christian Grönroos and set up in cooperation with professors Martin Lindell, Sören Kock, Tore Strandvik and Kaj Storbacka. The centre was founded to do frontline academic research on relationship marketing and service management and to uphold the research traditions of the Nordic School of marketing.

Activity 
33 doctoral theses have been defended and published at CERS, along with a number of academic articles. According to the Finnish Journal of Business Economics (1/2007), CERS founder Christian Grönroos is the most cited business professor in Finland, with CERS professors Veronica Liljander and Tore Strandvik among the top 15. CERS maintains an active co-operation with the business community and arranges workshops for its partner companies. It also organizes the annual CERS Award competition for excellence in relationship marketing.

References

External links 
 Hanken - Swedish School of Economics and Business Administration
 CERS - Centre for Relationship Marketing and Service Management
 Helsinki Business Campus

Education in Helsinki
Research institutes